Legislative elections were held in South West Africa on 8 March 1961. The whites-only election saw a victory for the National Party of South West Africa, which won 16 of the 18 seats in the Legislative Assembly. It marked the last time during the apartheid era that any other party won seats.

Electoral system
The 18 members of the Legislative Assembly were elected from single-member constituencies. Prior to the elections two constituencies (Outjo and Rehoboth) were abolished and replaced by Tsumeb and Windhoek District. The other constituencies were Aroab, Gobabis, Grootfontein, Keetmanshoop, Luderitz, Maltahöhe, Mariental, Okahandja, Otjikondo, Otjiwarongo, Swakopmund, Usakos, Warmbad, Windhoek East, Windhoek North and Windhoek West.

Results

References

Election
South West Africa
Elections in Namibia
1961 elections
Election and referendum articles with incomplete results